ζ Coronae Borealis , Latinised as Zeta Coronae Borealis, is the Bayer designation of a double star in the constellation Corona Borealis. The two components are separated by six arc-seconds and share the same Hipparcos catalogue number and Flamsteed designation.  Each of the two is also a spectroscopic multiple system, with a total of five stars in the group.

Nomenclature
ζ Coronae Borealis has the Flamsteed designation 7 Coronae Borealis and the Hipparcos catalogue number HIP 76669.  As a double star, the brighter component is designated A (e.g. WDS J15394+3638 A) while the fainter of the two is designated B.  The brighter star is also known as ζ2 Coronae Borealis and the fainter as ζ1 Coronae Borealis.

Each of the pair has its own Bright Star Catalogue and Henry Draper Catalogue numbers: HR 5833 and 5834, and HD 139891 and 139892 for ζ1 and ζ2 respectively.

System
ζ1 Coronae Borealis is a single-lined spectroscopic binary, with an orbital period of about 9.5 days.  The nature of the companion is unknown.

The brighter star, ζ2 Coronae Borealis, is a spectroscopic triple system, consisting of three massive stars.  The inner pair orbit in 1.7 days, while the outer pair orbit in 251 days.

References

Coronae Borealis, Zeta
Corona Borealis
Coronae Borealis, 07
076669
5833 4
139891 2
Durchmusterung objects
Double stars
Spectroscopic binaries
Triple star systems
B-type main-sequence stars